TVH is a short form of several things:

 Thermote & Vanhalst, an industrial and agricultural equipment company 
 Star Trek IV: The Voyage Home, a 1986 film in the Star Trek franchise
 T-V-H (cable system), a submarine telecommunications cable system linking Thailand, Vietnam, and Hong Kong
 Total vaginal hysterectomy, a surgical removal of the womb through the vagina
 Thames Valley Harriers, an athletic club based at Linford Christie Stadium, West London
 Television Hokkaido (TVh), a Japanese TV station in Hokkaido